Song Bird is the second studio album by American singer Deniece Williams, released on October 28, 1977, by Columbia Records. The album rose to No. 23 on the US Billboard Top Soul Albums chart and No. 5 on the UK Blues & Soul Top British Soul Albums chart.

Overview
Song Bird was produced by Maurice White.

Critical reception

With a four out of five rating Simon Gage of The Daily Express described Song Bird as being "filled with gorgeous songs that showcase her four-octave range to full effect". John Rockwell of The New York Times stated "Deniece Williams's “Song Bird” is a most appealing album for anyone who likes varied, skillful and sophisticated singing in the black pop area." He also added "One can't be more stylistically precise than that because it is a characteristic of Maurice White's production and Miss Williams's virtuousically diverse singing that her disk ambles all over the stylistic map. But instead of sounding diffuse, it sounds refreshingly varied.".

Singles
"Baby, Baby My Love's All for You" rose to No. 13 upon the US Billboard Hot R&B Songs and No. 32 on the UK Pop singles chart.

Samples and Covers
"We Have Love for You" was sampled on the track "Remember Them Days" by Beanie Sigel featuring Eve off Sigel's 2000 album The Truth. Williams also covered Ferlin Husky's Time upon the album

Appearances in other media
Williams went on to perform the album cut God Is Amazing at the 
1984 Grammy Awards.

Track listing

Personnel
 Deniece Williams – lead vocals
 Deniece Williams, Maurice White, Sidney Barnes – backing vocals
 Jerry Peters – piano
 Larry Dunn – synthesizer
 Al McKay, Charles Fearing, John Rowin Jr., Marlo Henderson – guitar
 Nathan Watts, Verdine White – bass
 David Garibaldi, Fred White, Maurice White – drums
 Paulinho da Costa – percussion
 Victor Feldman – vibraphone
 Andrew Woolfolk, Azar Lawrence, Don Myrick, George Patterson – saxophone
 Charles Loper, George Bohanon, Louis Satterfield – trombone
 Chuck Findley, Michael Harris, Oscar Brashear, Steve Madaio – trumpet
 Don Myrick – saxophone solo (6, 8)
 Michael Harris – trumpet solo (8)
Tom Tom 84 (Tom Washington) – string and horn arrangements

Production
 Producer – Maurice White
 Co-Producer – Jerry Peters
 Engineer – Warren Dewey
 Assistant Engineer – Jack Rouben
 Design – Nancy Donald
 Photography – Kenneth McGowan 
 Management – Cavallo-Ruffalo Management

Charts

References

1977 albums
Deniece Williams albums
Albums produced by Maurice White
Albums produced by Jerry Peters
Columbia Records albums